This is a list of football teams based in West Midlands County sorted by which league they play in as of the 2019-20 season. The leagues are listed in order of their level in the English football league system.

Levels 1–4

These West Midlands clubs play in fully professional leagues, comprising levels 1–4 of the English football league system: the Premier League and the Football League.

Levels 5–8
These West Midlands clubs play in semi-pro leagues which are at a level in the English football league system that grants eligibility to enter the FA Trophy, comprising levels 5–8 of the system: the National League and the Northern Premier League.

References

West Midlands
West Midlands
Football clubs